Provost of Trinity College may refer to:
 List of Provosts of Trinity College Dublin, Ireland
 List of Provosts of Trinity College, University of Toronto, Canada

See also
 Trinity College (disambiguation)
 Provost (education)